Talaspur Kalan is a small village in Aligarh district of Uttar Pradesh, India. According to the Election Commission of India, the total voters in the village is around 2000.

This village also has a  relatively rich population of Schedule caste people and was earlier under the "Ambedkar Village" scheme of Uttar Pradesh.

Though just 5 km from the district headquarters, the village was provided with electricity in 1991 and now almost all households have electricity connections. It has only one small elementary school and the most of the population is jobless or doing very low grade jobs. However, there is a plot allotted by the government to build school for girls, but it has been encroached.

This village has a lot of lands along the road and thus giving good money to those who are selling its land.

The illiteracy is high in this village and liquor is indeed at the alarming rate and most villagers feel that the village administration has been not able to overcome this problems. Light comes 5-6 hrs in a day.

Villages in Aligarh district